Karsten Thormaehlen (born 28 July 1965) is a German photographer, editor and creative director. He currently lives in Wiesbaden.

Family
Thormaehlen was born into a family with many influential personalities of Germany's 20th century art scene. His great-grandfather Emil Thormaehlen (1859–1941) was an architect and principal of the arts and crafts schools Magdeburg and Cologne. He was also co-founder of Deutscher Werkbund. One of his two sons, Ludwig Thormaehlen (1889–1956), was a Professor of Art History, a sculptor and between 1914 and 1933 a curator at the Alte Nationalgalerie Berlin. Among other artists he was befriended with Edvard Munch and Erich Heckel, a member of the expressionist artist's group Brücke. His great-great aunt Alexe Altenkirch (1871–1943) was a painter and a graphic designer at Zanders Papers. She once had been photographed by August Sander for his famous series People of the 20th Century.

Life and work 
Thormaehlen grew up in Bad Kreuznach and Bingen am Rhein. After a commercial apprenticeship and civilian service he studied Philosophy, Art History, Political science and Graphic Design in Mainz and Wiesbaden, where he graduated with honors in 1993. Between 1994 and 1998 he worked as an art director and photographer for a German owner-managed advertising agency in New York City, where he developed advertising campaigns and directed TV-commercials.

Thormaehlen's freelance portrait projects include Jahrhundertmensch (2008), Happy at Hundred (2011), Aging Gracefully (2017) and Silver Heroes (2009). They have been published as books and have been exhibited in Germany, Austria, Switzerland and Japan. Thormaehlen's works "Erika E., born in 1910", and "Susannah M. Jones, at age 116", were chosen for the exhibitions by the National Portrait Gallery in London as part of the 2011 and 2016 Taylor Wessing Photographic Portrait Prizes. His work has been included in The Guardian.

He works as a commercial photographer, taking portraits. Since 2010, he has worked as an assistant professor, lecturer and guest speaker at various universities, academies and photo festivals, including the RheinMain University, the Academy of Visual Arts Frankfurt or Fürstenecker Fototage. In 2021 his first solo exhibition Not Another Second has been presented at the art gallery of The Watermark at Brooklyn Heights and will tour the country throughout 2021, with stops in Los Angeles, Napa, California and Tucson, Arizona.

Exhibitions

Solo exhibitions 
 2009: Karsten Thormaehlen: Silver Heroes, Frankfurt City Public Health Department, Frankfurt, Germany
 2010: Karsten Thormaehlen: Jahrhundertmensch, MMK 3, Museum für Moderne Kunst Frankfurt, Germany
 2014: Karsten Thormaehlen: Pioniere der Zukunft, University of Zurich, Schlieren, Switzerland
 2014: Karsten Thormaehlen: Aktiv in die Zukunft, DOSB Deutscher Olympischer Sportbund, Dominikanerkloster, Frankfurt, Germany
 2015: Karsten Thormaehlen: Happy at Hundred, Toranomon Hills, Tokyo, Japan, 16–18 April 2015
2021: Karsten Thormaehlen: Not Another Second, The Watermark at Brooklyn Heights, January 2021

Group exhibitions 
 2004: Im Rausch der Dinge, Fotomuseum Winterthur, Winterthur, Switzerland
 2005: The Nature of Skin, Kunsthaus Hamburg, Barlach Halle K, Hamburg, Germany
 2011: Taylor Wessing Photographic Portrait Prize, National Portrait Gallery, London
 2016: Taylor Wessing Photographic Portrait Prize, National Portrait Gallery, London
 2018: Pink is the New Grey, Weltkulturenmuseum, Frankfurt, Germany

Publications 
 Not Another Second – LGBT+ Seniors Share Their Stories, von Ines Newby und June Hussey, Tucson, Arizona: Watermark Retirement Communities, 2021.  .
Rome. Kempen, Germany: teNeues, 2004. .
Jahrhundertmensch. Frankfurt, 2008. .
Happy at Hundred. Heidelberg: Kehrer, 2011. .
Silver Heroes. Heidelberg: Kehrer, 2012. .
Aging Gracefully. San Francisco: Chronicle Books, 2017. .
100 Jahre Lebensglück. Munich: Knesebeck, 2017. .

Awards 
 ADC Germany Hamburg
 ADC New York
 Black & White Spider Awards Beverly Hills
 Best of Business to Business Award Düsseldorf
 Cannes Lions Festival
 Clio Awards
 D&AD London
 Deutscher Alterspreis
 DSA Design Award Tokyo
 Portrait of Humanity London
 Px3 Prix de la Photographie Paris
 Taylor Wessing Photographic Portrait Priz London

References

External links 
 
 
 Maddie Crum, The Huffington Post, on Thormaehlen's book Aging Gracefully – Portraits of People Over 100 (Chronicle Books, San Francisco 2017)
 What Aging Gracefully Looks Like After 100, Tori Latham, New York Magazine
 Stella Malfilatre, The Age of No Retirement, Aging Gracefully
 Ellen Scott, metro.co.uk, Brilliant photo series celebrates the beauty of ageing
 These people are over 100 and kicking ass, Lauren Steussy, The New York Post 
 Mary Jo Dilonardo, mother nature network, Fall in love with these wise, joyful 100-year-olds
 Liam Dargan, Creative Conscience, interview with Thormaehlen
 Gianni Pawlas, Issue No. 206, Happy at Hundred

1965 births
Living people
People from Bad Kreuznach
Photographers from Rhineland-Palatinate